Manuel R. Camus (October 16, 1875 – December 22, 1949) was a lawyer and a Philippine senator. He completed his education in Singapore and returned to the Philippines in 1899 to serve as an interpreter and translator for the Provost Marshal General of the United States Army.

From 1928 to 1931, he served as a senator in the Philippine Senate.

Senator Manuel Camus served the Senate from 1928 to 1931.

A lawyer by profession, he held position in numerous private and public offices : Partner, Dizon and Zavalla; acting honorary consul for Peru; Vice-president, Gold Rock Mining Co.; member, board of directors, Federated Management and Investment Syndicate; member, Anti-Usury Board; president, El Hogar Filipino; scout commissioner, Philippine Council, Boy Scouts of America; director, Metropolitan Theater Co.; president, national committee, Y.M.C.A. of the Philippine Islands; chairman, disaster relief committee, Philippine Red Cross (American National Red Cross); member, American Bar Association; president, Community Publishers, Inc.; and president, executive committee, Greater Manila Civic League.

Manuel R. Camus (October 16, 1875 – December 22, 1949) was a lawyer and a Philippine senator. He completed his education in Singapore and returned to the Philippines in 1899 to serve as an interpreter and translator for the Provost Marshal General of the United States Army. From 1928 to 1931, he served as a senator in the Philippine Senate. He was a charter member (1936) and the president and chief scout of the Boy Scouts of the Philippines in 1945 to 1949.

He was a charter member (1936) and the president and chief scout of the Boy Scouts of the Philippines in 1945 to 1949.

The seven charter members and founding

Fathers of the Boy Scouts of the Philippines are Joseph Emile H. Stevenot, Arsenio N. Luz, Carlos P. Romulo, General Vicente Lim, Judge Manuel R. Camus, Jorge B. Vargas and Gabriel A. Daza.

On January 1, 1938, the inauguration of the Boy Scouts of the Philippines was held in front of the Legislative Building in Manila, with Exequiel Villacorta taking over as chief scout executive, equivalent to the position of today's secretary general.

J.E.H. Stevenot served as the first president of the BSP, with Jorge B. Vargas as first vice president, Carlos P. Romulo as second vice president, General Vicente Lim as treasurer, Judge Manuel R. Camus as national scout commissioner, Exequiel Villacorta as chief scout executive, and Severino V. Araos as deputy chief scout executive.

References

Scouting in the Philippines
Senators of the 8th Philippine Legislature
1875 births
1949 deaths
20th-century Filipino lawyers
Expatriates from the Philippines in British Malaya